Vikram Vedha is a 2017 Indian Tamil-language neo-noir action thriller film written and directed by Pushkar–Gayathri and produced by S. Sashikanth under his banner YNOT Studios. The film stars R. Madhavan, Vijay Sethupathi, Shraddha Srinath, Kathir and Varalaxmi Sarathkumar while Prem, Achyuth Kumar, Hareesh Peradi and Vivek Prasanna play supporting roles. Inspired by the Indian folktale Baital Pachisi, the film tells the story of Vikram, a police inspector who sets out to track down and kill Vedha, a gangster. After Vedha voluntarily surrenders himself, he tells Vikram three stories which change his perceptions of good and evil.

In January 2015, Sashikanth revealed that he would be producing a film directed by the husband and wife duo, Pushkar and Gayathri. Following a year of development on the script throughout 2015, Madhavan and Sethupathi were selected to play the lead roles in February 2016. Principal photography began in November of the same year and was completed by January 2017. The film was shot mainly in North Chennai, with the area being used as its backdrop. Sam C. S. composed the soundtrack and score, P. S. Vinod performed the cinematography, and the film's editor was A. Richard Kevin.

Vikram Vedha was released on 21 July 2017 to critical acclaim with critics praising its cast's performances (particularly Madhavan and Sethupathi), writing, narrative style and major technical aspects. Made on a budget of 110 million (about US$1,661,631 in 2017), the film performed well at the box office, grossing 600 million (about US$9,063,444 in 2017) worldwide despite experiencing difficulties due to the changes resulting from the implementation of the Goods and Services Tax. Vikram Vedha won four Filmfare, Vijay and Norway Tamil Film Festival awards each. Additionally, it received three Ananda Vikatan Cinema Awards, two Techofes Awards and an Edison Award. In 2022, the film was remade in Hindi under the same title by the same directors.

Plot 
Vikram is an honest inspector, who has a black-and-white sense of good and evil. Vedha is a dreaded gangster who understands the nuance in between. Vikram's best friend Simon leads an encounter unit formed to eliminate Vedha. In one encounter, the squad kills some of Vedha's henchmen, framing an unarmed criminal killed by Vikram to avoid further inquiry. As the unit plans another encounter, Vedha enters the police station and voluntarily surrenders. When Vikram interrogates Vedha, he offers to narrate a story to him. The first act relates about Vedha becoming a drug smuggler, who warns his younger brother Vignesh, nicknamed Pulli due to his mathematical skills, to stay away from crime, but Pulli is forced by a rival gangster Ravi, to carry drugs. When Pulli and his friend Chandra are caught by the police, Pulli confesses and Ravi is arrested. 

On his boss Sangu's orders, Ravi assaults Pulli, leaving a permanent scar on his hand. Vedha asks Vikram if he should kill Ravi or Sangu. Vikram replies that Sangu was the real culprit, to which Vedha implies that he killed Sangu. Vedha's lawyer, who turns out to be Vikram's wife Priya, intervenes and bails him out. Vikram realises that the unarmed criminal framed by them for avoiding inquiry was actually Pulli, based on the mark in his hand. Worried that Vedha might try to kill Simon, Vikram rushes to save Simon, but finds him and Chandra shot dead. SP Surendhar dismisses it as a botched encounter. Priya refuses to divulge Vedha's whereabouts to Vikram. Enraged by this, Vikram raids Vedha's tenements and manages to capture him. Vedha requests Vikram to listen to another story. 

The second story relates with Pulli, now grown-up, offering to launder Vedha's income by investing it in shares. Vedha's boss Cheta invests  in this venture. However, Chandra is supposedly kidnapped and the money is missing. Chandra returns and reveals that she stole the money to start a new life, but came back because she loves Pulli. Vedha returns the money to Cheta, who orders him to kill Chandra. Vedha asks Vikram if he should respect Cheta and carry out the order or disobey him and support Pulli and Chandra, thus inciting a gang war. Vikram replies that he should support Pulli, to which Vedha agrees. Realising Pulli's innocence causes Vikram to stumble momentarily, Vedha attacks and subdues him, telling him to investigate Simon and Pulli's deaths. 

Vikram begins his investigation with Simon's informant Kaattai who led them to Pulli's hideout, but finds that Kaattai has been killed. Vikram and his unit tries to find the killer, where he takes a moment to recollect and finds one of the members of the Kerala Quotation Gang from Vedha's story. Vikram apprehends and fights him only for the gang member to almost kill Vikram before getting shot and killed by his unit member Santhanam. Vikram searches his room, but finds a cigar and learns that the cigarette is filled with marijuana instead of tobacco. Vikram deduces that Ravi is behind the encounter and informs Vedha at his restaurant, who brings Ravi to an abandoned factory. Vikram arrives and meets Vedha, who tells the third and final act to Vikram. Vedha had sent Pulli and Chandra to Mumbai. He noticed that only his men, except Cheta's are being targeted and eliminated by the cops. 

On Ravi's confession, Vedha tells that Simon was bribed by Ravi to kill his men. Vedha asks Vikram if Simon was right, since he became corrupt to pay for his son's medical procedure. Vedha kills Ravi, leaving Vikram frustrated on finding out who had killed Simon. Surendhar and the unit arrive, where he castigates Vikram for letting Vedha escape again. Vikram slowly realises that the entire unit had also been bribed by Ravi. Surendhar reveals that Ravi paid them to kill Vedha and Chandra's abduction was intended to get Pulli out of Mumbai, which would lure Vedha out of hiding. However, a guilt-ridden Simon had gone to save Chandra, but the unit had killed them both. As the unit prepares to kill Vikram, Vedha reappears and saves him. A gunfight ensues, and Vikram disables all his colleagues with Vedha's help, but kills Surendhar. Vikram asks Vedha if he should let him go for saving his life or kill him since he is a criminal where a standoff ensues between them.

Cast

The Cops 
 R. Madhavan as Inspector Vikram
 Prem Kumar as Simon
 Achyuth Kumar as Surendhar
 Manikandan as Santhanam
 George Vijay as Prabhakar
 Babu as Ansari
 Vaaladi E. Karthik as Pandian
 E. Ramdoss as Velraj
 Satya as Hari
 Gopi as Thiyagarajan

The Gangsters 
 Vijay Sethupathi as Vedha
 Hareesh Peradi as Cheta
 Vivek Prasanna as Ravi
 Augustine as Vellai
 Kutta as Ganja
 Amar as Sangu
 Siva as Dilli
 Sugunthan as Jijo
 Babu as Gundu Babu
 Vijay Muthu as Muni
 Ashok as Kaattai

The Families 
 Shraddha Srinath as Priya
 Kathir as Vignesh (Pulli)
 Varalaxmi Sarathkumar as Chandra
 Gowrilakshmi G as Anitha
 J. K. Abhay as Alex
 Akash as young Pulli
 Vaishnavi as young Chandra
 Gaurav Kalai as Dilip

Production

Development 
After the release of Va (2010), the husband and wife director duo Pushkar, and Gayathri took a break from filmmaking. They decided to explore other genres during this time as their earlier films, Oram Po (2007) and Va, were comedies. The duo planned to make their next project, which would be titled Vikram Vedha, with a more serious tone where emotions like anger, hatred, and pain drove the characters' motives. This led to their decision to develop characters whose actions are not entirely good or evil.

The duo initially considered setting the film either in politics, business or journalism before finally deciding on a police-gangster background. The Indian folktale Baital Pachisi inspired the development of the story. The ghost-like being Vetala who posed morally ambiguous questions to King Vikramaditya, each of which could result in more than one answer, attracted them. The film's title and its characterisation of Vikram (Vikramaditya) and Vedha (Vetala) were also derived from the tale.

In a January 2015 interview with journalist and film critic Sudhish Kamath of The Hindu, S. Sashikanth, the owner of production house YNOT Studios, confirmed that he would produce the project. Pushkar and Gayathri continued to develop the script throughout 2015, completing it in April 2016. Dhilip Subbarayan and P. S. Vinod were selected to be the stunt choreographer and cinematographer respectively. Richard Kevin also worked as an assistant director in addition to handling the film's editing. Manikandan was selected to write the dialogues after initially auditioning for and then playing the role of Santhanam.

Casting 

Pushkar and Gayathri met R. Madhavan while working on the post-production phase of Sudha Kongara's Irudhi Suttru (2016). It was confirmed in February 2016 that Madhavan and Vijay Sethupathi would play the respective roles of an encounter specialist and a gangster. They agreed to do the project as both were intrigued by the idea of a film based on the Baital Pachisi tale. In addition to growing a beard for his role, Madhavan did not workout to lose weight. Instead, he followed a strict diet, including not eating anything after 6:00 pm and keeping a gap of five and a half hours after each meal. Sethupathi sported a salt and pepper beard for the role of Vedha.

Kathir was cast in the role of Vedha's brother Pulli because Pushkar and Gayathri were impressed by his performance in Kirumi (2015). In October 2016, Shraddha Srinath was cast as Vikram's wife after her performance in U Turn (2016) made an impression on Pushkar and Gayathri. This was then officially finalised after her screen test. The same month, John Vijay was signed to play a gangster but later opted out due to scheduling conflicts with the Malayalam film Comrade in America (2017).

Filming 
Vikram Vedha was made on a budget of ₹110 million (about US$1,661,631 in 2017). Principal photography began on 16 November 2016 in Kasimedu, North Chennai with Varalaxmi Sarathkumar joining the team as the second female lead. The first schedule consisted of filming scenes featuring Sethupathi, Kathir and Varalaxmi for five days. The second schedule commenced on 28 November 2016 with additional scenes involving Sethupathi shot at Vyasarpadi.

On 15 December 2016, Madhavan began shooting for his solo sequences and the portions where he appears alongside Sethupathi in the middle of the second schedule. The climax sequence was filmed over four days at Binny Mills. Production continued throughout December 2016, with Sethupathi finishing his work in early January 2017. Principal photography concluded later that month after sequences featuring Madhavan and Srinath were shot. The entire film was completed over a period of 53 days.

Opening sequence 
Sandhya Prabhat and Jemma Jose designed the opening animation sequence which Nassar narrated. In an interview with S. Naagarajan of The New Indian Express, Prabhat said that Pushkar and Gayathri wanted her "to adapt the theme of the [Baital Pachisi] for the opening credits". After drafting the initial sketches of the animated characters, the duo then gave Prabhat "a scene-by-scene picturisation" of their perspective of the tale in addition to requesting she make the entire sequence "look aesthetic". Prabhat and Jose designed the sequence to synchronise with the track "Karuppu Vellai".

According to Jose, the colouring for the sequence was mainly grey, black, and white and shades of red for Vetala's eyes, in keeping with the film's theme. Pushkar and Gayathri wanted Prabhat and Jose to use a "desaturated" palette with "strong and powerful" tones. The sequence was traditionally animated as Prabhat and Jose believed that "complex graphics and multi-layered effects" would distract the audience from understanding the film's main plot. The entire animation sequence, from storyboarding to animation took one and a half months to complete.

Themes and influences 
As the film is inspired from Baital Pachisi, it consists of an animation sequence involving Vikramaditya and Vetala, on which the main characters Vikram and Vedha are formed. Gopi Prasanna, the title designer of the film, shared the film's poster title in Tamil (விக்ரம் வேதா) on Instagram, where the letter வி (Vi) in Vikram is stylized to resemble Vikramaditya's sword, and தா (Dha) in Vedha is stylized to resemble Vetala's tail.

Music 

Sam C. S. composed the film's soundtrack and score and wrote the lyrics for the track "Pogatha Yennavittu" while Mohan Rajan, Muthamil and Vignesh Shivan provided the lyrics for the songs "Yaanji", "Tasakku Tasakku" and "Karuppu Vellai" respectively. Sam had worked previously for Pushkar and Gayathri on television commercials. They decided to recruit him after being impressed with his work on Puriyatha Puthir (2017). The audio rights are with Think Music.

Before the release of the album on 19 June 2017, the tracks "Tasakku Tasakku" and "Yaanji" were released as singles on 5 June 2017 and 12 June 2017 respectively. Sharanya CR from The Times of India noted in her review that Sam "brings out the essence of the film’s plot" with "Karuppu Vellai", and used the term "stylish, yet flawless" to describe Anirudh's and Shakthisree Gopalan's rendition of "Yaanji". She felt "Pogatha Yennavittu" was "an impressive composition" and appreciated the "very peppy" beats in "Tasakku Tasakku", adding that it "can be reserved for parties". Sharanya concluded her review by stating that "the composer hits the high-note" with Vikram Vedha, writing further that "the film's narrative is sure to up the experience through music" with the instrumental tracks.

Marketing
The official Twitter handle of the film was launched on 30 December 2016. The film's official title poster was released on 2 February 2017. The official first look poster of the film was released on 24 February 2017. The teaser trailer was released on 13 March 2017, which features action sequences between Madhavan and Vijay Sethupathi. The teaser trailer crossed 10 million views within 24 hours of its release. The official trailer was released by actors Shah Rukh Khan and Sivakarthikeyan, through YouTube on 22 June 2017.

Release

Theatrical
Vikram Vedha was initially given an "A" certificate by the Central Board of Film Certification due to the amount of violence present. The producers, however, successfully approached the censor board again to get a "U/A" certificate so it would have more appeal to family audiences.

The film was scheduled to release on 7 July 2017, but was postponed due to the strike by the Tamil Film Producers Council over the implementation of the Goods and Services Tax in India and the removal of the Local Body Tax imposed by the Government of Tamil Nadu on the council. After the state government reached an agreement with the Producer's Council to set up a committee to look into the issue, screening of films at theatres resumed on 6 July. Vikram Vedha, along with Hiphop Tamizha's Meesaya Murukku, was subsequently released worldwide on 21 July 2017. R. Ravindran under his Trident Arts banner distributed the film in Tamil Nadu and released it to 350 screens across the state. ATMUS Entertainment handled distribution in the United States.

Home media
The film is available for streaming on ZEE5.

Reception

Box office 
Vikram Vedha grossed 170 million worldwide in the first weekend of its theatrical run, earning 100 million in Tamil Nadu alone. By the end of its second weekend, the total box office collections for the film in Tamil Nadu were 250 million. Within two weeks of its release, the film earned 400 million worldwide becoming, at the time of its release, the second-highest grossing Tamil film of the year after Baahubali 2: The Conclusion.

The film also performed well in the United States, earning more than $150,000 in its first three days. It collected $366,000 by the end of the first week. Vikram Vedha completed a theatrical run of 100 days on 28 October. As of December 2017, the film has earned 600 million (about US$9,063,444 in 2017) globally.

The content of the film and its commercial success helped revive the box office prospects of the Tamil film industry, leading to many theatre owners and distributors like Abirami Ramanathan, owner of Abhirami Mega Mall, and K Meenakshisundaram, vice-president of Mayajaal, stating that people would come to watch films with good content irrespective of the Goods and Services Tax.

Critical response 

Vikram Vedha opened to positive critical reviews with praise for all major aspects of the production.

Writing for The Indian Express, Manoj Kumar R called it "the best film to release in Tamil this year". He felt that though both Madhavan and Sethupathi "have competed with each other" in providing performances that were "intense and convincing", it was Sethupathi who "manages to draw the applause and whistles from the audience for his natural performance". Karthik Kumar of the Hindustan Times labelled Madhavan's performance "good" and believed Sethupathi played Vedha with "unmatchable swag", adding he was "unarguably the best thing to have happened to the film". Srivatsan of India Today compared the interactions and mind games between Vikram and Vedha favourably to those of Batman and the Joker in The Dark Knight (2008); he termed the film a "smartly-written thriller, which has a texture, well-developed character arcs and filmmaking gimmickry".

M Suganth, in his review for The Times of India, found Madhavan to be "stylish and serious" and Sethupathi as "all swag". Anupama Subramaniam of the Deccan Chronicle said that Sethupathi "oozes of charisma" and Madhavan gave "a whole-hearted" effort while making the audience relate to the character's emotions. Ragesh Gopinathan from Malayala Manorama thought the film "a work of sheer brilliance" with "the perfect blend of style and substance". Gopinathan also believed that Srinath, Varalaxmi and Peradi "offer a realistic portrayal of their characters." In his review for Firstpost, Sreedhar Pillai described the film as "a triumph of smart writing, superb characterisation and terrific performances by the lead actors Madhavan and Vijay Sethupathi who make it crackle". He also commended Varalaxmi's performance as Chandra, saying that she "lends the film some warmth" despite being cast in "an insignificant role". Film critic and journalist Baradwaj Rangan noted in his review for Film Companion that Sethupathi was "fantastic" and spoke "crowd-pleasing lines in the most casual fashion". He also found Chandra "the most convincingly written character". A reviewer from Sify pointed out that Madhavan's "subtle" and Sethupathi "inimitable" performances were the "real strength" of the film, adding that Srinath was "brilliant" and Varalaxmi appeared "audacious and innocent" throughout. The Quints Vikram Venkateswaran called Madhavan's performance "flawless" adding that the actor "simply eats up the screen" with his presence. He however criticised Sethupathi, opining that he "has played himself for far too long" saying there is "so much more to him than just the fact that he’s as relatable as a friendly neighbourhood smart alec".

Suganth noted that all the conversations between the characters, and even the opening sequence, were "carefully assembled puzzle pieces". However, he criticised the convoluted plot structure and the "lack of gravitas", which made the film seem "tiresome" and "laidback".  Vishal Menon of The Hindu wrote the film was "a terrific exploration of good, evil and everything in between" but felt the second half took "the shape of an investigative thriller" which slowed down the film's pace. Karthik commended Pushkar and Gayathri's writing which "succeeds in piquing the intellect of audiences like no recent Tamil film". The Sify reviewer praised the directors' handling of human emotions, calling the characters' grey shades "a novel aspect". Furthermore, Priyanka Thirumurthy of The News Minute wrote that the directors' "intelligent screenplay takes you through a rollercoaster of twists and turns". Likewise, Sudhir Srinivasan, writing for The New Indian Express praised Pushkar and Gayathri's "beautifully written, incredibly well-made" contemporary adaptation of the Baital Pachisi. Mythily Ramachandran, in her review for Gulf News, believed the "powerful writing" of Puskhar and Gayathri's screenplay, the "well defined" characters and "flawless performances" from the entire cast, were the film's main highlights.

Several critics found Vinod's past experiences in shooting gangster films such as Thiagarajan Kumararaja's Aaranya Kaandam (2011) a contributing factor towards the success of Vikram Vedha. Pillai and the Sify reviewer found Vinod's cinematography and camera angles helped create the appropriate "tension and mood" and perfectly capture the environment of North Chennai. Rangan compared the cinematography positively to the "light and shadow play" seen in film noir, concluding that "there isn't one uninteresting frame" and the film can be watched for the filming techniques alone.

Accolades

At the 65th Filmfare Awards South, Vikram Vedha received nominations in seven categories, including Best Film (Sashikanth) and Best Supporting Actress (Varalaxmi), winning four. Madhavan and Sethupathi received nominations in the Best Actor category with the latter winning the award; Madhavan in turn won the Critics Award. The other awards it received were for Best Director (Pushkar–Gayathri) and Best Male Playback Singer (Anirudh for "Yaanji"). The film won four of its fifteen nominations at the 10th Vijay Awards, including Best Director and Best Screenplay Writer (both received by Pushkar–Gayathri), Best Actor (Sethupathi) and Best Background Score (Sam). The film also won four Norway Tamil Film Festival Awards, three Ananda Vikatan Cinema Awards, two Techofes Awards and an Edison Award.

Remake 
In March 2018, Pushkar–Gayathri announced that they would direct the film's Hindi remake, to be produced again by YNOT Studios. The Hindi remake, also titled Vikram Vedha, was released on 30 September 2022.

In popular culture 
The interrogation scene and theme music has been parodied in Tamizh Padam 2.

References

External links 
 

2010s police procedural films
2010s Tamil-language films
2017 action thriller films
2017 crime action films
2017 crime thriller films
2017 films
Fictional portrayals of the Tamil Nadu Police
Films about organised crime in India
Films based on fairy tales
Films based on fantasy works
Films based on Indian folklore
Films directed by Pushkar–Gayathri
Films scored by Sam C. S.
Films set in Chennai
Films set in Mumbai
Films shot in Chennai
Indian action thriller films
Indian crime action films
Indian crime thriller films
Indian films with live action and animation
Indian gangster films
Indian neo-noir films
Indian nonlinear narrative films